Girls Taking Time Checks is a 1904 silent actuality film photographed by G. W. Bitzer for the Biograph Company in conjunction with Westinghouse Electric & Manufacturing Company. It was released by the Biograph Company.

Synopsis
An endless stream of young women stream out of the Westinghouse factory taking their time checks. (#note: as this is 1904 the film was more than likely filmed at the Westinghouse Lamp Plant in Bloomfield, New Jersey)

References

External links
 Girls Taking Time Checks at IMDb.com
Girls Taking Time Checks available for free download at Internet Archive

1904 films
American silent short films
1904 short films
Biograph Company films
American black-and-white films
1900s American films